The goldfinned barb (Barbodes semifasciolatus sachsii) is a subspecies of ray-finned fish in the genus Barbodes. It has been reported to be from Singapore, but the validity of this taxon is questionable and some authorities treat it purely as a synonym of Barbodes semifasciolatus.

References 

Barbodes
Fish described in 1923